Jason Carty (died September 2021) was a British masters sprint athlete and world record holder.

Masters Athletics Career
At the European Masters Indoor Championships in March 2015, Carty won the gold medal in the 60m in the M45 category in a time of 7.24. Later in the year, after a successful British Masters Championships, Carty came second in the 100m at the World Masters Championships to Reggie Pendland of the US, just ahead of his British rival Darren Scott.

In 2016, Carty was diagnosed with lung cancer. But he returned to competitive athletics and at the World Masters Athletics Championships in 2018 he took gold in the M45 100m in a new British record, and also won the 4x100m relay.

References

20th-century births
2021 deaths
British male sprinters
Year of birth missing